Reborn may refer to:

Film
Reborn, a 2015 video produced by the Augustine Institute
Re:Born (film), a 2016 Japanese action film
Reborn (film), a 2018 American horror film

Music
Reborn (band), a Moroccan death metal band

Albums
Reborn (Avalon album) or the title song, 2009
Reborn (Diaura album) or the title song, 2013
Reborn (Era album) or the title song, 2008
Reborn (Finding Favour album) or the title song, 2015
Reborn (Denny Laine album) or the title song, 1996
Reborn (Kavinsky album), by Kavinsky, 2022
Reborn (Living Sacrifice album), 1997
Reborn (Manafest album) or the title song, 2015
Reborn (Northern Kings album), 2007
Reborn (Stryper album) or the title song, 2005
Reborn (Trapt album), 2007
Re:Born (album), by Gackt, 2009
Re:Born (EP), by Soyou, 2017

Songs
"Reborn" (Kids See Ghosts song), 2018
"Reborn", by AKB48 from Kibōteki Refrain, 2014
"Reborn", by Biohazard from Reborn in Defiance, 2012
"Reborn", by Damageplan from New Found Power, 2004
"Reborn", by the Living End from State of Emergency, 2006
"Reborn", by Rae Morris from Someone Out There, 2018
"Reborn", by Rebecca St. James song from Transform, 2000
"Reborn", by Scar Symmetry from Symmetric in Design, 2005
"Reborn", by Slayer from Reign in Blood, 1986

Other uses
Reborn!, a Japanese manga, anime, and media franchise
Reborn (Arcobaleno), a fictional character in the manga and anime
Reborn (novel), a 1990 Adversary Cycle novel by F. Paul Wilson
Reborn, a group of fictional characters in the video game Star Wars Jedi Knight II: Jedi Outcast
Reborn doll, a type of art doll modified to resemble a living infant

See also
Born again (disambiguation)
Rebirth (disambiguation)
Reincarnation
Resurrection
Second Coming